John Emanuel Nyman  (25 April 1908 – 19 October 1977) was a Swedish heavyweight Greco-Roman wrestler. He was the national champion in 1935–42 and won silver medals at the 1936 Summer Olympics and 1937 and 1938 European championships. In retirement he worked as a wrestling coach and physical education teacher at his club SAIK.

References

External links
 

1908 births
1977 deaths
Olympic wrestlers of Sweden
Wrestlers at the 1936 Summer Olympics
Swedish male sport wrestlers
Olympic silver medalists for Sweden
People from Sundsvall
Olympic medalists in wrestling
Medalists at the 1936 Summer Olympics
Sportspeople from Västernorrland County
20th-century Swedish people